Notre-Dame-du-Laus is a municipality in the Laurentides region of Quebec, Canada, part of the Antoine-Labelle Regional County Municipality.

The municipality is characterized by hilly forests with a great number of lakes, rivers, and creeks. Because of those nature gems, there are many cottages owned and built in the area. The eastern portion of its territory is part of the Papineau-Labelle Wildlife Reserve. Consequently, the local economy is dependent on forestry as well as on the influx of tourists, fishermen and hunters.

History
Between 1820 and 1849, the Hudson's Bay Company operated a trading post at the outlet of Sables Lake on the Du Lièvre River that controlled all the fur brigades from the upper Du Lièvre and Gatineau Rivers.

In 1873, the Notre-Dame-du-Laus parish was founded, named after the apparitions of Our Lady of Laus. In 1876, the place was incorporated as the United Township Municipality of Bigelow-Wells-Blake-et-McGill, and two years later the post office, which was named Notre-Dame-du-Laus, opened.

In February 1946, the municipality was renamed to its current name.

Demographics

Private dwellings occupied by usual residents (2021): 932 (total dwellings: 1,924)

Mother tongue:
 English as first language: 3.8%
 French as first language: 94.7%
 English and French as first language: 0.9%
 Other as first language: 0.9%

See also
 List of municipalities in Quebec

References

Incorporated places in Laurentides
Municipalities in Quebec